Derbyshire County Cricket Club in 2007 was the cricket season when the English club Derbyshire had been playing for one hundred and thirty-six years. In the County Championship, they finished  sixth in the second division. In the Pro40 league, they finished eighth in the second division. They were eliminated at group level in the Friends Provident Trophy and came eighth in the North section of the Twenty20 Cup.

2007 season

Derbyshire was in Division 2 of the County Championship and finished in sixth position. In addition to the Championship, they played Cambridge University. Of their seventeen first class games, they won two and lost three, the remainder being drawn. Derbyshire was in Division 2 of the NatWest Pro40 League in which they  won one of their eight matches to finish eighth in the division. In the Friends Provident Trophy Derbyshire played in the Northern group, coming eighth in the table.  In the Twenty20 Cup, Derbyshire played in the North Division and won one match to finish sixth in the division. Simon Katich was captain and top scorer with three centuries.  Tom Lungley took most wickets.

Derbyshire recorded their highest ever score, 801 for eight declared, against Somerset at Taunton in May. Their score beat their previous highest ever score, of 707 for 7 declared also against Somerset also at Taunton in the 2005 season. Simon Katich scored 221, Ian Harvey 153, Ant Botha 101 and James Pipe 106. Derbyshire broke the record despite losing Phil Weston and Chris Taylor to Andy Caddick in the first over without a run on the board.

Matches

First Class

NatWest Pro40 League

Friends Provident Trophy

Twenty20 Cup

Statistics

Competition batting averages

Competition bowling averages

Wicket Keeping
James Pipe 
County Championship  Catches  42, Stumping 4  
PRO40 Catches 6, Stumping 2 
Friends Provident Catches 5, Stumping 1 
Twenty20 Catches 1, Stumping 2   
Thomas Poynton 
County Championship Catches 3  
Twenty20 Catches 0, Stumping 2   
Frederik Klokker

See also
Derbyshire County Cricket Club seasons
2007 English cricket season

References

2007 in English cricket
Derbyshire County Cricket Club seasons